Lela or C'lela is a Kainji language of Nigeria. It is known as Cilela in Hausa, and it is also known as Dakarkari, because it is spoken by the Dakarkari people

Location
The Lela live mostly in Kebbi State and Niger State. However, there are also some C-Lela speakers in other parts of Nigeria, including in Gummi LGA of Zamfara Ztate.

References

Further reading
Sociolinguistic survey (level one) of the Lela people

Northwest Kainji languages
Languages of Nigeria